Edison Kola (born 3 April 2001) is an Albanian professional footballer is an Albanian professional footballer who plays as a centre-back for Super League 2 club AEL.

Career statistics

Club

References

External links

2001 births
Living people
Albanian footballers
Super League Greece 2 players
Ergotelis F.C. players
Association football defenders
Footballers from Heraklion
Greek footballers